Luo Ruiqing (May 31, 1906 – August 3, 1978), formerly romanized as Lo Jui-ch'ing, was a Chinese army officer and politician, general of the People's Liberation Army. As the first Minister of Public Security from 1949 to 1959, he established the security and police apparatus of the People's Republic of China after the Communist victory in the civil war, and then served as the Chief of the Joint Staff from 1959 to 1965, achieving military victory in the Sino-Indian War.

Despite being a close associate and supporter of Mao Zedong for decades, Luo was targeted, purged, and severely beaten during the Cultural Revolution, which he opposed from the beginning.

Biography
Luo Ruiqing was born in Nanchong, Sichuan in 1906 and joined the Chinese Communist Party in 1928 at the age of 22. He was the eldest son of a wealthy landlord named Luo Chunting (罗春庭), who had a total of six children. However, Luo Chunting was an opium addict and lost all his wealth due to his addiction, and the entire family had to rely on Luo Ruiqing's mother, who left no first name, but only her surname Xian (鲜). Despite the decline in family wealth, Luo's family was still able to afford the large sum of money needed for his education, and this fact was used by the Red Guards to attack Luo during the Cultural Revolution. Luo's early life was deliberately ignored in official Chinese records until the 1990s because his petty bourgeois background did not fit into the political environment until the end of the 20th century.

Luo participated in the Long March and held several security posts in the People's Liberation Army. He was transferred to Shaanxi to oversee the training of young cadres. He led several purges of supporters of former General Secretary Wang Ming. He was then put in charge of eliminating the faction loyal to Zhang Guotao, Mao Zedong's rival in the Fourth Front Army, shortly after his political defeat.

After the founding of the People's Republic of China, Luo was appointed Minister of Public Security and a member of the Central Military Commission. As such, he was responsible for consolidating the new system against its internal enemies; in 1950, at a conference in Beijing, he supported the establishment of a paramilitary force under his ministry, similar to the Soviet MVD.

Luo fought in the Korean War from 1950 to 1953. In 1955, he was decorated as Da Jiang, or General of the Army, the highest rank of general in the People's Liberation Army.

At the Eighth National Congress of the Chinese Communist Party in 1956, he was elected a member of the Central Committee and its Secretariat, and Secretary-General of the Central Military Commission. He was also elected a Vice-Premier of the State Council in 1959.

After Huang Kecheng was removed from his posts along with Peng Dehuai in 1959, Luo replaced him as chief of the Joint Staff. However, his reluctance to follow Mao's idea of emphasizing political education in the army and his rifts with Lin Biao led to his dismissal in December 1965, although he remained a vice premier.

During the early stages of the Cultural Revolution, he was branded as part of the "Peng-Luo-Lu-Yang Anti-Party Clique" (with Peng Zhen, Lu Dingyi, and Yang Shangkun). After the criticism sessions, he attempted suicide by jumping from the third floor of a building in the Jingxi Hotel, surviving with both legs broken. This was seen as proof of his guilt, and he received further public criticism after he recovered. He was hospitalized several times in the following years and had his left leg amputated in 1969.

Luo was rehabilitated by Mao during a meeting of the Central Military Commission in 1975, when Mao realized that Lin Biao had fabricated a case against the former general. In 1977, Luo was elected to the 11th Central Committee and regained his post as CMC Secretary-General.

Luo died on August 3, 1978, while in West Germany for medical treatment.

See also
 Campaign to Suppress Counterrevolutionaries

External links

High Tide of Terror, a strongly critical article about Luo Ruiqing published on March 5, 1956, by Time Magazine
 Biography of Luo Ruiqing, Xinhuanet
 杨成武谈揭批罗瑞卿实情, ("Yang Chengwu discusses the true facts about the campaign to expose and criticise Luo Ruiqing"), Yanhuang Chunqiu magazine, Beijing, 2005 Vol. 10. General Yang Chengwu, who took part in the campaign against Luo, recalls the events.

1906 births
1978 deaths
Politicians from Nanchong
People's Liberation Army generals from Sichuan
People's Republic of China politicians from Sichuan
Chinese Communist Party politicians from Sichuan
Victims of the Cultural Revolution
Ministers of Public Security of the People's Republic of China
People's Liberation Army Chiefs of General Staff
Burials at Babaoshan Revolutionary Cemetery